Brampton Transit (BT) is a public transport bus operator for the City of Brampton in the Regional Municipality of Peel, and within the Greater Toronto Area (GTA) in Ontario, Canada. Brampton Transit began operations in 1974.

In 2010, Brampton Transit introduced Züm, a bus rapid transit route running along Queen Street and Highway 7 from downtown Brampton to York University, along Main Street from Sandalwood to Square One in Mississauga and along Steeles from Brampton Gateway Terminal to Humber College.

Connections 
Brampton Transit is connected with Milton Transit to the west, Mississauga's MiWay to the south, Toronto Transit Commission to the southeast and York Region Transit to the east.

Steeles Avenue is a major Brampton thoroughfare. Route 11 Steeles formerly ran from west of Brampton Gateway at Hurontario Street, and eastward into Toronto to Humber College's Main Campus. There is a transfer at the college with Route 50 Gore Road, that serves developments in the Gore Road area near the former Highway 50 and Albion Road. In September 2007, the western part of the route was cut back to Brampton Gateway and replaced with Route 51 Hereford. It connects with Miway at Mississauga Road and Meadowvale Boulevard. The 511 Züm Steeles route serves the entire length of Steeles through the city, from Humber College to Lisgar GO station in Mississauga.

Brampton Transit carries commuters to and from the Kitchener line railway station operated by GO Transit. There are transfers to and from the trains and buses at the Bramalea, Brampton, and Mount Pleasant (opened February 2005) stations, and direct connections to express buses at Bramalea City Centre and Trinity Common, and adjacent stop at Brampton Gateway.

Fares 

Fares are as of February 28, 2022. The cash fare is $4.00 (exact change).

Customers paying their bus fares with cash (and in some cases, special purpose paper tickets) may request for a paper transfer from the bus driver; for customers using Presto cards, the transfer is applied automatically from initial tap on.  Both are valid for two hours from the time of first boarding, which allows customers to transfer freely between Brampton Transit buses in any direction, as well as transferring to neighbouring Milton Transit, MiWay (Mississauga) and York Region Transit services.

Since August 11, 2022, customers also have the option to pay the equivalent of the Brampton Transit adult cash fare by contactless credit card or mobile wallet by tapping it on a Presto fare reader. 

Similar to the Presto card, the 2-hour transfer, valid in any direction, is applied automatically onto a customer's contactless credit card or mobile wallet after the initial fare is paid.

Preschoolers, blind people and senior residents – who resides in the City of Brampton for those ages 65 and older so long as they carry a valid Brampton Transit Identification Card and a Presto card with a free annual pass loaded on it – can travel fare free on Brampton Transit. War veterans also travel for free by Veteran Transit Pass Program.

Regular fares:

Other fares:

‡ Only available at
 Mount Pleasant GO Station
 Downtown Brampton Terminal
 Bramalea GO Station
 Malton GO Station
 Lisgar GO Station

Terminals

Bramalea Terminal

Brampton Gateway Terminal 

The new terminal, located on the northwest corner of Steeles Avenue and Main Street, opened on 26 November 2012. replacing the Shoppers World Terminal

Downtown Terminal 

Downtown Terminal consists of two platform areas. The first being the terminal itself just off of Main and Nelson which services routes such as:
501/501A Züm Queen
561 Züm Queen West
1/1A Queen
52 McMurchy

The second portion is the two Züm stops on opposite sides of Main street. These stops service routes:
502 Züm Main
2 Main
24 Van Kirk
25 Edenbrook

For GO bus and trains servicing Downtown Brampton Terminal, see Brampton GO Station

Heart Lake Terminal 
Location: Conestoga Drive, NW of Sandalwood Parkway and Kennedy Road
Coordinates: 
Opened: Unknown
Brampton routes: 2, 3/3A, 7/7A, 21, 23
Transit connections: None

Shoppers World Terminal 

This terminal was replaced by Brampton Gateway Terminal, located on the northwest corner of Steeles Avenue and Main Street, on 26 November 2012.  The facility stands empty; it is to be demolished and the area to be used by Shoppers World Brampton as an additional parking lot.

Trinity Common Terminal

GO Train stations 
Bramalea GO Station – Brampton Routes: 13, 15/15A, 16, 40, 92
Brampton GO Station – connection to Downtown Transit Terminal via pedestrian tunnel.  Also connects with Via Rail
Mount Pleasant GO Station – Brampton Routes: 1, 4/4A, 5/5A, 9, 29/29A, 55, 60, 104, 505, 561
Lisgar GO Station in Mississauga – Brampton Routes: 11, 511
Malton GO Station in Mississauga – Brampton Routes: 14/14A, 505  Also connects with Via Rail

Terminals outside Brampton 
Westwood Square in Mississauga – Routes: 5/5A, 14/14A, 30
Humber College (North Campus) in Toronto – Routes: 11/11A, 50, 511/511A/511C
Pearson International Airport in Mississauga – Route: 115
York University in Toronto, connecting to the Toronto Transit Commission (TTC) subway and bus system and YRT en route – Route: 501C Züm Queen 
Mississauga City Centre Transit Terminal in Mississauga – Route: 502 Züm Main
Dixie Transitway Station in Mississauga – Brampton/MiWay Route: 185
University of Toronto at Mississauga in Mississauga – Route: 199

Routes 
All Brampton Transit and Züm routes are wheelchair-accessible.

Vehicles 
BT has an active fleet of 375+ buses including:
 New Flyer:
 2002 D40LF: 0201-0221 (Sandalwood)
 2003 D40LF: 0301-0317 (Sandalwood)
 2004 D40LF: 0401-0435 (0401-0418: Sandalwood. 0419-0435: Clark)
 2010 XDE40: 1050–1074 (Sandalwood)
 2011 XDE40: 1150–1165 (Sandalwood)
 2011 XD40: 1101–1130 (Clark)
 2012 XD40: 1201–1218 (1201–1210: Sandalwood. 1211–1218: Clark)
 2012 XDE40: 1250–1251 (Sandalwood)
 2012 XDE60: 1275–1294 (Sandalwood)
 2013 XDE60: 1475–1484 (Sandalwood)
 2014 XDE60: 1575–1579 (Sandalwood)
 2015 XDE60: 1580–1592 (Sandalwood)
 2016 XDE60: 1675–1682 (Sandalwood)
 2017 XDE60: 1775–1784 (Sandalwood)
 2018 XDE60: 1875–1885 (Sandalwood)
 20?  XE40: ? (5 units, part of the Pan-Ontario Electric Bus Trial for 2018)
 Nova Bus:
 2005–2006 2nd Gen LFS: 0601-0621 (Clark)
 2006: 2nd Gen LFS: 0622-0638 (0622-0625: Clark. 0626-0638: Sandalwood)
 2007: 2nd Gen LFS: 0701-0715 (Sandalwood)
 2008: 2nd Gen LFS: 0801-0827 (0811-0812, 0821-0827: Clark. 0813-0820: Sandalwood)
 2009: 2nd Gen LFS: 0901-0916 (0910, 0912-0916: Clark. 0901-0909, 0911: Sandalwood)
 2009: 3rd Gen LFS: 0917-0926 (Sandalwood)
 2014: 4th Gen LFS: 1401–1414 (1401–1410: Clark. 1411–1415: Sandalwood)
 2015: 4th Gen LFS: 1501–1519 (1501–1509: Sandalwood. 1510–1519: Clark)
 2016: 4th Gen LFS: 1601–1623 (1601–1609: Sandalwood. 1610–1623: Clark)
 2017: 4th Gen LFS: 1701–1713 (mixed garage allocations)
 2018: 4th Gen LFS: 1801–1823 (Mixed Garages)
Retired models include:
 GMC New Look (T6H-4523N, T6H-5307N, T8H-5307A and others) Last unit retired in early 2007.
 New Flyer D800B (last unit retired in 2001).
 New Flyer D40 Suburban (formerly GO Transit) – retired in 2003 and 2004.
 Orion Bus Industries Orion I in 30' and 40' versions (last unit retired in 2011).
 Motor Coach Industries Classics retired in 2008.
 Leyland Olympian Double Decker 8500 (sold, now operated by a tour company in downtown Toronto)
 Orion Bus Industries (Orion V models from 1991 & 1999, Orion VI models from 1996 & 1998)
Brampton Transit Transit Enforcement Officers patrol in white hybrid vehicles (Ford Fusion, Toyota Camry) with red and blue stripes.

Depots 
Brampton Transit operate depots in Clark and Sandalwood.

Bus rapid transit 

Züm is Brampton's bus rapid transit system. Its first corridor, 501 Queen was launched on September 20, 2010, and runs along Queen Street from Downtown Brampton to York University via Bramalea Terminal. It later branched out to add to frequency to the route with the 501A going along Highway 407, and the 501C begins at Bramalea Terminal rather than Downtown Brampton, to York University (The 501A&C branches are not operating due to COVID-19). Along with 3 other corridors like the, 502 Züm Main which runs North & South along Main/Hurontario Street from Sandalwood Loop to Mississauga City Centre Transit Terminal (Square One). The 511 Züm Steeles goes east to west along Steeles Avenue, from Lisgar GO Station in Meadowvale, Mississauga, to Humber College in Toronto via Sheridan College and Brampton Gateway Terminal.

Incidents 

On July 3, 2018, four people were stabbed while riding the Züm bus in the area of Queen Street and McVean Drive. A 49-year-old man, was taken to a trauma centre with injuries that were serious but not life-threatening. Three Brampton women aged 28, 19 and 18 were also taken to a local hospital. 20-year-old Jade Nelson was later arrested and charged with four counts of attempted murder.

See also 
Brampton Transit makes connections to other transit systems in the Greater Toronto Area:
 Milton Transit
 MiWay (Mississauga Transit)
 Toronto Transit Commission (TTC)
 GO Transit
 UP Express
 York Regional Transit (YRT)
 Via Rail

References

External links 

 Official site
 Brampton Transit Fares
 Drawings and photos of Brampton Transit buses
 Amalgamated Transit Union Local 1573

 
Transit agencies in Ontario
Transport companies established in 1974
1974 establishments in Ontario